The Agojo refugee settlement is a refugee camp in the Adjumani District of Northern Uganda, opened in 2016 in response to an influx of South Sudanese refugees fleeing the insecurity in their country.

Education 
Agojo refugee settlement has limited educational opportunities. Refugees pay high tuition fees which many cannot afford, exacerbated by insufficient scholarships and vocational training opportunities. Parents often sell their food rations to supplement school fees.

Water and health 
Agojo refugee settlement has limited water availability, with refugees being able to fill only up two jerry cans per day. The amount of water transported in has decreased, and only one borehole is operational, with no piped water system. This leads refugees to walk long distances to access potable water in the nearby communities where they have to pay or risk tensions with the locals. Moreover, the water is of poor quality.

References 

Refugee camps in Uganda
Adjumani District